Arbroath High School is a six-year, all-through comprehensive school situated on the west side of Arbroath, Angus, Scotland. It moved into its present building in 1985.

Accommodation
The new building was opened in 1985 to serve the west side of Arbroath and outlying areas, such as the villages of Arbirlot, Carmyllie and Colliston.

The school was built in a residential area not far from the town centre. As well as the facilities normally associated with schools, it has priority use during the day of Arbroath Sports Centre, containing a full-sized swimming pool, squash courts, gymnasium and games hall. The general public make use of these facilities outside school hours. There are extensive playing fields adjacent to the school, including an all-weather, floodlit astroturf pitch.

Admissions
Arbroath High is the larger of two secondary schools in Arbroath, the other being Arbroath Academy, which serves the east end of Arbroath and surrounding areas. Intake is from eight associated primary schools – Arbirlot, Carmyllie, Ladyloan, Colliston, Inverbrothock, Muirfield, St Thomas' and Timmergreens. A small number of pupils enter from other primaries in the surrounding areas.

History
The school began life as a grammar school, formed from the former Arbroath Academy and the Free Church Educational Institution. It became and remains a state comprehensive school. Its old building now houses the Arbroath campus of Dundee and Angus College.

Alumni

High school
Neil Burnett (born 1961), cricketer
David Chapel (1882–1912), cricketer
Patrick Hennessy (painter) (1915–1980), realist painter
Kenneth Gordon Lowe (1917–2010), physician and medical researcher
Andy Webster (born 1982), professional footballer

Grammar school
Marion Angus (1865–1946), poet in Braid Scots and standard English
Sir William Duke (1863–1924), Indian civil servant
James Falconer (1856–1931), Liberal MP in 1909–1918 and 1922–1924 for Forfarshire
Michael Forsyth, Baron Forsyth of Drumlean (born 1954), Conservative MP from 1983–1997 for Stirling, and Secretary of State for Scotland from 1995–1997
Sir John Kirk (1832–1922), African explorer and administrator
Cargill Gilston Knott (1856–1922), mathematician, seismologist, and expert of earthquakes in Japan
Allan MacDonald (1892–1978), Australian politician
George Robert Milne Murray (1858–1911), botanist
Peter Mills (born 1955), RAF Chaplain-in-Chief and minister of the Church of Scotland
Andy Stewart (musician) (1933–1993), singer and entertainer
Mike Weir (born 1957), Scottish National Party MP for Angus from 2001 to 2017
Kathleen Whyte MBE (1909–1996), embroiderer and textile-arts teacher

Educational Institution
Joseph Anderson, antiquarian, museum keeper and author (1832–1916)

References

External links
School website

Secondary schools in Angus, Scotland
Arbroath